Juha Helppi (born 4 March 1977) is a Finnish professional poker player from Helsinki.

Career
Juha was originally a croupier. He worked as a dealer for RAY in Finland but never dealt poker. He made a name for himself in the first World Poker Tour (WPT) event in Aruba, where he eliminated Kathy Liebert on the way to defeating professional player Phil Gordon in a heads-up challenge match. He has since made two other WPT final tables, with a 4th-place finish in the Season 1 Battle of Champions and a 2nd-place finish to England's Roland De Wolfe in the Grand Prix de Paris 2005 event.

At the 2019 World Series of Poker, he won his first World Series of Poker bracelet in the $10,000 Limit Hold'em Championship.  In total, he has finished in the money in 29 WSOP events.

In November 2005, Helppi faced Phil Laak and Kenna James in the first ever underwater poker tournament and was awarded the Caribbean Poker Classic Extreme Poker bracelet.

In March 2007, Helppi won the inaugural Premier League Poker title, defeating some of the all-time greats along the way, such as Phil Hellmuth and Dave "Devilfish" Ulliott. Helppi defeated German pro and two-time WSOP Bracelet winner Eddy Scharf In heads-up play to win the title.

As the winner of InterPoker's first extreme poker tournament, he earned the right to choose the next year's location.  He chose to play it in Kemi on the frozen Gulf of Bothnia. He finished second, losing to former WSOP champion Robert Varkonyi.

As of 2019, his total live tournament winnings exceed $7,700,000. His WSOP cashes account for over $1,350,000 of those winnings.

Helppi is a high level paintball player and the captain of the Finnish national paintball champions 1997, 2003, 2007, 2008 and 2014. When younger, he played Magic: The Gathering successfully for several years.

World Series of Poker bracelets

An "O" following a year denotes bracelet(s) won during the World Series of Poker Online

References

1977 births
Living people
Finnish poker players
World Poker Tour winners
World Series of Poker bracelet winners